The Campaign to Suppress Bandits in Eastern China was a counter-guerrilla / counterinsurgency campaign the communists fought against the nationalist guerrilla that was mostly consisted of bandits and nationalist regular troops left behind after the nationalist government withdrew from mainland China.  The campaign resulted in communist victory.

Strategies
The nationalists had faced a precarious dilemma in waging the campaign against its communist enemy because of complex situation they had faced, and consequently, made several grave miscalculations which contributed to their eventual failure.

Nationalist miscalculations
Like other nationalist futile attempts to fight guerrilla and insurgency warfare against the communists after being driven off from mainland China, the very first grave strategic miscalculation made by the retreating nationalist government contributed at least equally if not greater than the enemy's political and military pressure to the nationalist defeat in this campaign.  The very first strategic miscalculation made by the retreating nationalist government was identical to the earlier one the nationalist government had made immediately after World War II, when it had neither the sufficient troops nor enough transportation assets to be deployed into the Japanese-occupied regions of China, and unwilling to let these regions falling into communist hands, the nationalist government ordered the Japanese and their turncoat Chinese puppet government not to surrender to the communists and allowed them to keep their fighting capabilities to "maintain order" in the Japanese occupied regions by fighting off the communists.  This earlier miscalculation resulted in further alienation and resentment to the nationalist government by the local population, which had already blamed the nationalists for losing the regions to the Japanese invaders during the war.  Half a decade later when the nationalists were driven from mainland China, they had made the similar miscalculation once again in their desperation, this time by enlisting the help of local bandits to fight the communists, and ordering the nationalist troops left behind to join these bandits in the struggle against the communism.  However, the bandits were deeply feared and hated by the local populace they plagued for so long, and nationalist troops left behind joining the bandits certainly did not help them win the support of the general population.  In fact, it served the exact opposite, strengthening the popular support of their communist enemy.

The second grave strategic miscalculation made by the retreating nationalist government was also similar to the one the nationalist government had made immediately after World War II, when it attempted to simultaneously solve the warlord problem that had plagued China for so long with the problem of the exterminating communists together: those warlords allied with Chiang Kai-shek's nationalist government were only interested in keeping their own power and defected to the Japanese side when Japanese invaders offered to let them keep their power in exchange for their collaborations.  After World War II, these forces of former Japanese puppet governments once again returned to the nationalist camp for the same reason they defected to the Japanese invaders. Obviously, it was difficult for Chiang to immediately get rid of these warlords for good as soon as they surrendered to Chiang and rejoined nationalists, because such move would alienate other factions within the nationalist ranks, and those former Japanese puppet government's warlords could still help the nationalists to by holding on to what was under their control and fighting off communists, and they and the communists would both be weakened.  Similarly, the bandits the nationalist governments had failed to exterminate were obviously not good candidates for evacuation to Taiwan half a decade later, and using them to fight communists appeared to be the only logical alternative.  If the communists were great weakened by the bandits, then it would the nationalists would have easier time in their counterattacks to retake China.  If the bandits were defeated, then the nationalists would have easier job to eradicate them later after retaking China.  However, just like those warlords, these bandits were only interested in keeping their own power also, and thus did not put any real efforts to fight the communists like some of the nationalists who were dedicated to their political cause.  The eradication of bandits by the communist government only strengthened its popular support since previous governments (including the nationalist government itself) dating back from Qing Dynasty had failed to do so.

The third grave strategic miscalculation made by the retreating nationalist government was similar to the second one, but this one was about its own troops left behind.  The nationalist government had faced a dilemma: the highly disciplined troops were in desperate need to defend Taiwan, the last nationalist island sanctuary.  The less disciplined second rate and undisciplined third rate troops, both of which mostly consisted of warlords' troop were definitely not suited to be withdrawn to defend the last stand nationalists had made, and they were not given the top priority for evacuation.  Instead, they were left behind to fight the communists behind the enemy line, but such move had alienated many of the troops left behind, and it was impossible to expect them to fight their communist enemy with the same kind of dedication like those nationalist agents who believed in their political cause.  Compounding the problem, due to the need of bandits' knowledge of local area, they were often rewarded with higher ranks than the nationalist troops left behind.  As a result, the former-nationalist regular troops turned guerrilla fighters lacked any willingness to work together with the bandits they once attempted to exterminate, especially when many of the bandits had killed their comrades-in-arms earlier in the battles of eradications / pacifications.  Many loyal nationalists were enraged by the fact that they had to serve under the former-enemy they once fought.  Similarly, the bandits lacked the similar willingness and attempted to expend those nationalist troops whenever they could in order to save their own skin.

The fourth grave strategic miscalculation made by the retreating nationalist government was financial / economical: due to the lack of money, those bandits turned guerrillas were mostly provided with arms, but not sufficient supplies and money.  The bandits turned guerrilla had no problem of looting the local population to get what they need, as they had done for decades, which inevitably drove the general popular support further into the communist side.  The little financial support provided by the nationalist government was simply not enough to support such guerrilla and insurgency warfare on such a large scale.  Another unexpected but disastrous result of the insufficient financial support was that it had greatly eroded the support of the nationalist government within its own ranks.  The wealthy landowners and businessmen were the strong supporters of nationalist government and as their properties were confiscated by the communists and redistributed to the poor, their hatred toward the communist government was enough to cause many of them to stay behind voluntarily to fight behind the enemy line.  However, the landowners and businessmen were also longtime victims of bandits due to their wealth, and many of them had suffered even more than the general populace who had far less wealth.  As these former landowners and businessmen turned guerrilla fighters were ordered to join their former bandits who once threatened, looted, kidnapped and even killed them and their relatives, it was obvious that such cooperation was mostly in name only and could not produce any actual benefits, and the alienation and discontent toward the nationalist government harbored by these once ardent nationalists would only grow greater.

Another problem for the nationalists was the strong disagreement among themselves over how to fight the war against their communist enemy.   Military professionals preferred to fight a total war, incapacitate the enemy's ability to fight, but this inevitably conflicted with the interest of another faction of strong supporters of the nationalist government: the landowners and businessmen, who joined bandits to oppose such tactic.  The reason was that landowners and businessmen supporting and joining the nationalist guerrilla firmly believed that the nationalists would be able to retake mainland China within several years and they would be able to regain their lost lands, businesses, and other properties that were confiscated and redistributed to the poor by the communists.  As the nationalist military professionals in the guerrilla suggested and destroyed the production facilities and businesses as part of the total war, the landowners and businessmen would not be able to regain any valuable properties after the return of the nationalist government because those properties had been destroyed.  The bandits agreed with the businessmen and landowners to oppose the idea of total war for a different reason: when the properties were destroyed and productivity dropped, they would not be able to loot enough supply to survive.  As a result, despite the animosities between the bandits and landowners and businessmen, they were united together in the opposition to the military professional faction of the nationalists.

Communist strategies
In contrast to the nationalists, communists had much simpler but effective strategy because the communists did not have the dilemma the nationalists had, and all they had to do was to eradicate bandits.  The job of fighting a counterinsurgency and counter guerrilla war was made much easier for the communists by the grave strategic miscalculations nationalists they had made themselves, and communists exploited these to the maximum for their advantage.  As with all other bandit eradication campaigns, the most important communist strategy was to mobilize the entire population to fight the bandits, and furthermore, additional strategies were devised specifically to fit the local situation to fight the bandits.

Prelude
During its southward thrust against the retreating nationalists in May 1949, the communist 3rd Field Army was already preparing to suppress bandits in the following provinces of China: Shandong, Zhejiang, Fujian, Jiangsu, Anhui and Shanghai.  Intelligence work on bandits was already in process and by July 1949, there were more than 113,000 bandits and another 10,000 pirates totaling over 700 bands.  As the defeated nationalist regular forces scattered, most of them joined bandits to continue their struggle against communist, and the strength of bandits was more than doubled.

To eliminate this threat posed by bandits in eastern China, the communist 3rd Field Army deployed a total of nineteen divisions over the next four years to eradicate the bandits, and on August 9, 1949, the official order was given and the full-scale campaign had formally begun, with the concentration in Zhejiang and Anhui for initial phase in the autumn.

Order of battle
Nationalists
3rd Column of the Defense Ministry
3rd Column of the Jiangsu-Anhui Military Region
National Self-Salvation Army North Fujian Command
8th Column of the Fujian People's Anticommunism Army
Popular Self-defense Army of Zhejiang – Fujian – Jiangxi Border Region
Communists
5 Armies (1st Stage) and 19 Divisions (2nd Stage) of the 3rd Field Army

1st Stage
Large scale offensive against bandits begun in the late August, after small scale probing assaults, and by January 1950, over fifty-four thousand bandits were annihilated, along with their major bases in Taihu, and the border region of Fujian, Zhejiang and Jiangxi. The large bands of bandits in Jiangsu, northern Anhui and Zhejiang were destroyed. From 1950 onward, the communists targeted Fujian and Zhejiang as the major concentration to eliminate the remaining bandits that survived the major offensives.  In Fujian, a total of eight regiments of regular communist forces were deployed, succeeding in destroy the major bandit force under the nationalist command titled National Self-Salvation Army North Fujian Command. On the other fronts, communist forces succeeded in annihilating bandits forces of the 3rd Column of the Defense Ministry and the 3rd Column of the Jiangsu-Anhui Military Region that were active in the regions of Zhejiang, southern Jiangsu and northern Anhui.

After the Korean War broke out in June 1950, bandits stepped up their offensives, believing that the communists would be soon defeated by the Americans and the nationalists would return soon under the help of their western allies. The communists adjusted their strategies accordingly by increasing their forces to a total of seven regular divisions, four local garrison divisions, and additional militia units. In Fujian, the communist regular army strength was increased to 50% to twelve regiments from the original eight.  In Zhejiang, two divisions of the communist 22nd Army and a division of the communist 23rd Army were deployed in Tiantai (天台) region, Chuanshan (穿山) and Xiangshan (象山) peninsulas, where bandit activities were heavy.  The communist strategy was to first eradicate bandits in the heartlands, wealth regions, and regions next to the transportation / communication lines, and then those remote and poverty-stricken regions.  In November 1950, Mao Zedong ordered that another landing on Kinmen (Quemoy) to be postponed, until bandits in Fujian are completely eradicated.  The communist force in the province soon swelled to five divisions and after several months of eradication attempts, over thirty bands of bandits were completely annihilated, including 8th Column of the Fujian People's Anticommunism Army and the Popular Self-defense Army of Zhejiang – Fujian – Jiangxi Border Region.  By June 1951, all major organized bandit guerrillas were completely destroyed when communists succeeded in annihilating over 114,500 bandits.

2nd Stage
From June 1951 onward, the communist strategy shifted to eradication of the surviving bandits who managed to escape earlier eradication efforts.  With nearly all of the former nationalist forces wiped out in the 1st stage of the campaign, the survivors were mostly bandits with nationalist military advisors and agents, which were not as effective as before, when there were more regular army soldiers in the nationalist guerrillas.  The eradication tasks were consequently transferred to the local communist garrison and police force, with the help of local militias, while the communist regular force was withdrawn. Within a year, most of the surviving bandits on the mainland were annihilated.

However, the communists faced greater challenges in their struggle against pirates backed by the nationalist government in Taiwan, where communists were forced to deploy regular marines and navy, which was still in their infancy and thus inadequate for naval battles.  Instead of challenging the superior nationalist navy that backed the pirates, the communists adopted an alternative strategy by ambushing pirates who landed on the mainland, where the communist force was strong.  The tactic proved to be effective and in the month of January 1951 alone, over fifteen hundred pirates in over a hundred twenty bands were annihilated.  An additional several hundred pirates were also annihilated in 1951 when the communist navy engaged in fifty-six naval battles against pirates at sea, succeeding in sinking and capturing fifty-two boats and ships from the pirates. Beginning in 1951, communists also begun their island hopping campaign to capture coastal islands and eradicate pirates stationed on these islands.  When these islands fell into communist hands, the surviving pirates were forced to withdraw and the communist success in these naval engagements was mainly because its weak naval forces operated under the cover of shore artillery batteries and air cover.

The attempt to secure these coast islands took much longer than the fighting on lands, and it was not until the end of 1953 when the communist victory was finally achieved, which concluded the campaign itself.  The communists succeeded in annihilating over 246,000 bandits (including over 7,800 pirates), capturing over 400 artillery pieces, over 115,000 small arms and dozens of boats.

Outcome
Although sharing the common anticommunist goal, the nationalist guerrilla and insurgency warfare was largely handicapped by the enlistment of bandits, many of whom had fought and killed nationalist troops earlier in the eradication / pacification campaign, and also looted, kidnapped and even killed landlords and business owners, an important faction that supported the nationalist government, but now must united against the common enemy, which is half-hearted at the best. Compounding the problem further with additional differences within the ranks of the nationalist guerrillas themselves, the futile nationalist guerrilla and insurgency warfare against its communist enemy was destined to fail.

See also
List of battles of the Chinese Civil War
National Revolutionary Army
History of the People's Liberation Army
Chinese Civil War

References

Zhu, Zongzhen and Wang, Chaoguang, Liberation War History, 1st Edition, Social Scientific Literary Publishing House in Beijing, 2000,  (set)
Zhang, Ping, History of the Liberation War, 1st Edition, Chinese Youth Publishing House in Beijing, 1987,  (pbk.)
Jie, Lifu, Records of the Liberation War: The Decisive Battle of Two Kinds of Fates, 1st Edition, Hebei People's Publishing House in Shijiazhuang, 1990,  (set)
Literary and Historical Research Committee of the Anhui Committee of the Chinese People's Political Consultative Conference, Liberation War, 1st Edition, Anhui People's Publishing House in Hefei, 1987, 
Li, Zuomin, Heroic Division and Iron Horse: Records of the Liberation War, 1st Edition, Chinese Communist Party History Publishing House in Beijing, 2004, 
Wang, Xingsheng, and Zhang, Jingshan, Chinese Liberation War, 1st Edition, People's Liberation Army Literature and Art Publishing House in Beijing, 2001,  (set)
Huang, Youlan, History of the Chinese People's Liberation War, 1st Edition, Archives Publishing House in Beijing, 1992, 
Liu Wusheng, From Yan'an to Beijing: A Collection of Military Records and Research Publications of Important Campaigns in the Liberation War, 1st Edition, Central Literary Publishing House in Beijing, 1993, 
Tang, Yilu and Bi, Jianzhong, History of Chinese People's Liberation Army in Chinese Liberation War, 1st Edition, Military Scientific Publishing House in Beijing, 1993–1997,  (Volum 1), 7800219615 (Volum 2), 7800219631 (Volum 3), 7801370937 (Volum 4), and 7801370953 (Volum 5)

Battles of the Chinese Civil War
1949 in China
1950s in China
Campaigns to Suppress Bandits